Igor Taran (born 29 December 1983 in G'uzor) is an Uzbekistani footballer who plays as a striker. He currently plays for Neftchi Fergana.

Club career
He started his career at Shurtan Guzar before moving to FK Andijan in 2007 where he played for two seasons. In 2009, he returned to his former club Shurtan Guzar.

On 4 January 2013 Bunyodkor officially announced the signing of Igor Taran. In 2015, he moved back to Shurtan Guzar, after playing one season for Nasaf Qarshi in 2013.

International career
He made his debut for the Uzbekistan national football team on 11 August 2010 in a friendly match against Albania, which ended in a 1–0 win for Albania.

Honours

Bunyodkor
Uzbek League (1): 2013
Uzbek Cup (1): 2013

References

External links
 
 

1983 births
Living people
Uzbekistani footballers
Footballers at the 2006 Asian Games
Uzbekistani people of Russian descent
Association football forwards
Asian Games competitors for Uzbekistan
Uzbekistan international footballers
FK Andijon players
FC Shurtan Guzar players
FC Bunyodkor players
FC Nasaf players
FK Neftchi Farg'ona players